The Foss House is a home in New Brighton, Minnesota, United States, built by Ingeborg and Peder Foss. It is a large 1896 Victorian house featuring a corner tower. It is listed on the National Register of Historic Places.

References

External links
 NRHP nomination form

Houses in Ramsey County, Minnesota
Houses completed in 1896
Houses on the National Register of Historic Places in Minnesota
Queen Anne architecture in Minnesota
National Register of Historic Places in Ramsey County, Minnesota